This list of cemeteries in Rhode Island includes currently operating, historical (closed for new interments), and defunct (graves abandoned or removed) cemeteries, columbaria, and mausolea which are historical and/or notable. It does not include pet cemeteries.

Bristol County 
 DeWolf Cemetery, Bristol
 Juniper Hill Cemetery, Bristol; NRHP-listed
 Prince's Hill Cemetery, Barrington Civic Center Historic District, Bristol; NRHP-listed

Kent County 
 Governor Greene Cemetery, Warwick
 St. Mary's Church and Cemetery, Crompton, West Warwick; NRHP-listed
 West Greenwich Baptist Church and Cemetery, West Greenwich; NRHP-listed

Newport County 

 Arnold Burying Ground, Newport
 Artillery Park, Jamestown; NRHP-listed (also known as Churchyard Cemetery, and Historical Cemetery 2) 
 Clifton Burying Ground, Newport
 Coddington Cemetery, Newport
 Common Burying Ground and Island Cemetery, Newport; NRHP-listed
 Friends Meeting House and Cemetery, Little Compton; NRHP-listed
 Old Burying Ground at Little Compton Common Historic District, Little Compton; NRHP-listed
 Newport Memorial Park Cemetery, Middletown
 Old Friends' Burial Ground at Friends Meetinghouse, Jamestown; NRHP-listed
 Portsmouth Friends Meetinghouse, Parsonage and Cemetery, Portsmouth; NRHP-listed
 Touro Cemetery, Newport; NRHP-listed (also known as Jewish Cemetery at Newport)

Providence County 

 Carpenter, Lakeside, and Springvale Cemeteries, East Providence; NRHP-listed
 Harmony Chapel and Cemetery, Harmony; NRHP-listed
 L'Eglise du Precieux Sang cemetery, Woonsocket; NRHP-listed
 Little Neck Cemetery, East Providence; NRHP-listed
 McGonagle Site, RI-1227 cemetery, Scituate; NRHP-listed
 Newman Cemetery, East Providence; NRHP-listed
 North Burial Ground, Providence; NRHP-listed
 Riverside Cemetery, Pawtucket; NRHP-listed
 Smithfield Friends Meeting House, Parsonage and Cemetery, Woonsocket; NRHP-listed
 Swan Point Cemetery, Providence; NRHP-listed

Washington County 
 Casey Farm, Saunderstown; NRHP-listed
 Chestnut Hill Baptist Church and Cemetery, Exeter; NRHP-listed (also known as Baptist Church in Exeter)
 Devil's Foot Cemetery Archeological Site, RI-694, North Kingstown; NRHP-listed
 Indian Burial Ground, Charlestown; NRHP-listed
 Old Narragansett Church, Wickford; NRHP-listed

See also
 List of cemeteries in the United States

References

Rhode Island